Longfellow-Evangeline State Historic Site, located in St. Martinville, Louisiana, showcases the cultural significance of the Bayou Teche region. It is the oldest state park site in Louisiana, founded in 1934 as the Longfellow-Evangeline State Commemorative Area. Evangeline was Henry Wadsworth Longfellow's enormously popular 1847 epic poem about Acadian lovers, who are now figures in local history. In the town center, the Evangeline Oak is the legendary meeting place of the two lovers, Evangeline and Gabriel. A statue of Evangeline marks her supposed grave next to St. Martin of Tours Church.   The state historic site commemorates the broader historical setting of the poem in the Acadian and Creole culture of this region of Louisiana.

Several historic buildings are showcased at Longfellow-Evangeline State Historic Site, which cover :

Maison Olivier, designated a National Historic Landmark (as Acadian House) in 1974, is a plantation home built c. 1815 by Pierre Olivier Duclozel de Vezin, a wealthy Creole at the time. The structure is an excellent example of a Raised Creole Cottage, a simple and distinctive architectural form which shows a mixture of Creole, Caribbean, and French influences. Maison Olivier is located behind the Visitor's Center. Also near Maison Olivier is a blacksmith shop.

There is also a c. 1790 Acadian cabin, which reveals the contrast between Acadian and Creole architecture.

A reproduction Acadian farmstead lies near Bayou Teche. It is representative of a single-family farm in the early 19th century. It includes a family home, a barn, a privy, an outdoor kitchen, and a bread oven.

See also
List of Louisiana state parks
List of National Historic Landmarks in Louisiana
National Register of Historic Places listings in St. Martin Parish, Louisiana

References

External links

Official web site

Louisiana State Historic Sites
Protected areas of St. Martin Parish, Louisiana
Museums in St. Martin Parish, Louisiana
Historic house museums in Louisiana
Atchafalaya National Heritage Area
Houses in St. Martin Parish, Louisiana
Acadian history
Cajun culture
National Historic Landmarks in Louisiana
Historic American Buildings Survey in Louisiana
National Register of Historic Places in St. Martin Parish, Louisiana
Protected areas established in 1934
1934 establishments in Louisiana